Agean Cymbals is a manufacturer of cymbals and other percussion instruments of the Western Classical, Folk, and Turkish traditions. Their factory is located in Edirne, while its main office is situated in Istanbul. They state a commitment to preserving hand-crafting techniques and a tradition of cymbal making that dates back to the Ottoman Empire as part of their manufacturing ethos.

History 
Agean Cymbals was founded in 2002 by Behnan Gocmez. In 2007, the brand was bought by the Kırmızıgül family, who were already manufacturing traditional Turkish and other ethnic percussion instruments — including darbukas, doumbeks, and bongos — under the Kırmızıgül Company.

Until late 2007, the Agean Cymbals factory was located in Istanbul, a city with a long history of cymbal production, but the company decided to move production operations to Uzunköprü, Edirne, since traditional cymbal manufacture was becoming difficult to maintain in the city centre.

Agean cymbals have presented their products at Musikmesse Frankfurt, including 2007-2009 and 2017–2018. They were also set to present in 2020 but the event was cancelled due to the COVID-19 pandemic. In 2017, they presented a new kind of low-volume cymbal — a type often used for practice or in smaller venues where louder cymbals are impractical — using traditional B20 bronze alloy; the first company to use the material for low-volume cymbals.

In 2019 they expanded operations to produce other kinds of percussion instruments in addition to their line of cymbals.

Production Methodology and Philosophy 
The company's identity is based on the idea of preserving traditional cymbal-making techniques, stating: “we choose to manufacture our cymbals in the time honoured fashion — 100% hand-crafted”. Agean traces its pursuit of hand-making cymbals back to the bell-making tradition in the Ottoman Empire.

In this vein, their cymbals are hand-hammered and (in the low-volume cymbals) hand-drilled, forgoing the use of auto-hammering that is common within modern cymbal production. Cooking the cymbals — the process by which the metal cymbal “puck” is heated to high temperatures — is also done using coal and wood ovens dug into the ground (known as ground casting), rather than modern gas or electric ones. Traditional bronze alloys, such as B20 and B25, are used as their cymbal material, again foregoing more modern nickel-silver alloys commonly used in entry-level cymbals.

See also 

 List of cymbal manufacturers
 Cymbal making

References 

Cymbal manufacturing companies
Musical instrument manufacturing companies of Turkey
Manufacturing companies based in Istanbul